Ernest Kinghorn (1 November 1907 – 15 January 2001) was a British Labour Party politician who sat in the House of Commons from 1945 to 1951. Kinghorn was born in Leeds, and became a teacher after studying at the universities of Leeds, Basle and Lille. During World War II he served as an intelligence officer with the Royal Air Force, and in 1945 he was a staff officer with the Control Commission in Germany.

He unsuccessfully contested the Hexham division of Northumberland at the 1935 general election, but at the general election in July 1945 he was elected as the Member of Parliament (MP) for Great Yarmouth. He was re-elected in 1950, but at the 1951 general election he was defeated by the Conservative Party candidate Anthony Fell. He stood again in 1955, but without success.

He moved to Hanworth in the Middlesex suburbs of London. He was a member of Middlesex County Council from 1958 to 1965 and of the successor Greater London Council from 1964 to 1967 as well as Hounslow Borough Council from 1964 to 1968.

References

External links 
 

1907 births
2001 deaths
Labour Party (UK) MPs for English constituencies
UK MPs 1945–1950
UK MPs 1950–1951
Royal Air Force officers
Royal Air Force personnel of World War II
Alumni of the University of Leeds
University of Basel alumni
Politics of the Borough of Great Yarmouth
Members of the Greater London Council